Butch Posey (born ) is a former American football player and coach. He served as the interim head coach at Delaware State University in 2003.

A native of Pittsburgh, Pennsylvania, Posey attended college at Morgan State and Slippery Rock, playing on defense for both of their football teams. After earning a bachelor's degree in political science from Slippery Rock, Posey became an assistant coach at Clairton High School. He earned his first college coaching job in 1995, as Slippery Rock's linebackers coach. In the following years he would serve as defensive line coach for East Stroudsburg, Edinboro, Johnson C. Smith, North Carolina Central, and Delaware State before being promoted to Delaware State defensive coordinator in 2003. In late 2003, Hornet coach Ben Blacknall was fired after posting a 0–6 record. Posey was promoted to interim head coach and served in the final five games, compiling a 1–4 mark. He did not return to Delaware State the following year.

Head coaching record

References

Living people
Morgan State Bears football players
Slippery Rock football players
Slippery Rock football coaches
East Stroudsburg Warriors football coaches
Edinboro Fighting Scots football coaches
Johnson C. Smith Golden Bulls football coaches
North Carolina Central Eagles football coaches
Delaware State Hornets football coaches
1960s births